Jerusalem Army, also known as Al Quds Army,, was a volunteer force created on 17 February 2001 by the Iraqi government to assist the Palestinians to liberate Palestine and Jerusalem from Israel. The idea came following the eruption of the Palestinian uprising on 28 September 2000. Both men and women could join the Jerusalem Army. Experts said it was intended to be a mass volunteer force, with female as well as male units. It was dissolved pursuant to CPA Order 2, amongst other paramilitary organizations.

References 

2001 establishments in Iraq
2003 disestablishments in Iraq
Military units and formations established in 2001
Military units and formations disestablished in 2003
Paramilitary forces of Iraq